The Piggott National Guard Armory is a historic former Arkansas National Guard facility at 775 East Main Street in Piggott, Arkansas.  It is a large single-story concrete block structure, finished with a brick veneer, and topped by a gable roof with a clerestory section at the top.  The building was erected in 1956, during a period when armory spaces were undergoing a shift in use and scope.  The building was used as an armory until 2005, when it was given to the city by the state.

The building was listed on the National Register of Historic Places in 2006.

See also
National Register of Historic Places listings in Clay County, Arkansas

References

Military facilities on the National Register of Historic Places in Arkansas
Buildings and structures completed in 1956
Buildings and structures in Clay County, Arkansas
Armories on the National Register of Historic Places
Armories in Arkansas
National Register of Historic Places in Clay County, Arkansas